Targówek is a district in Warsaw, Poland located in the northern part of the city.

It is divided into two parts: residential and industrial. About 30% of the district's area is covered by municipal parks, such as Lasek Bródnowski, Park Bródnowski and Park Wiecha in the eastern part of the district. Between 1994 and 2002 Targówek was independent municipality.

Borders 
Targówek borders with Praga Północ from west, with Białołęka from north, with Rembertów, Ząbki and Marki from east and with Praga Południe from south.

Neighbourhoods within the district 
 Targówek Mieszkaniowy
 Targówek Fabryczny
 Bródno
 Bródno Podgrodzie
 Zacisze
 Elsnerów
 Utrata

References

External links